La Tribuna may refer to:

 La Tribuna (Honduras), a Honduran newspaper
 La Tribuna (Paraguay), a Paraguayan newspaper
 La Tribuna di Treviso, an Italian newspaper

See also
 Tribuna, a Russian newspaper
 La Tribune (disambiguation)